Wye Valley Brewery is a brewery in the village of Stoke Lacy, Herefordshire, England, in the Wye Valley. Founded in 1985 by Peter Amor, it has become "one of Britain's leading independent breweries". In 2002 Peter Amor's son, Vernon Amor, became managing director.

History and location
Wye Valley Brewery traces its ancestry to the Abbey Brewery, which was founded in November 1981 and operated from the owner's garage in Stainton, Rotherham. In mid-1982, Abbey Brewery located to Retford, Nottinghamshire with a capacity of at most 20bbl per week.
After being bought in 1983 by Peter Amor, a former brewer for Guinness who also worked for H. P. Bulmer, the brewery was closed, and the brewplant relocated to Canon Pyon, Herefordshire.

Another brewery, the Canon Pyon Brewery, had been established in a stable block behind the Nags Head Pub in Canon Pyon since early 1984. Upon the departure of the brewer and brewplant there to establish The Tate Brewery Limited in Bodenham, Herefordshire, brewing was reestablished in Canon Pyon with the Abbey Brewery plant by Peter Amor in 1985, and trading began under the name Wye Valley Brewery. It is from here that Wye Valley Brewery counts the beginning of its corporate history.
By 1986, Wye Valley had again relocated, this time to a pub called The Lamb in Hereford, which was renamed The Barrels.

After 18 years in Hereford, in 2002 the brewery was relocated to the village of Stoke Lacy, in northern Herefordshire, and the original brewplant sold to Teme Valley Brewery.

Brewery

The new brewery site was the former Symonds Cider plant; in order to purchase the site, the owners signed a covenant promising never to produce cider on the location. Upon conversion into a brewery, capacity was expanded to 80bbl per day and the former brewplant sold to Teme Valley Brewery.

In 2006, brewing was being conducted four days a week, for a total current production between 16000 and 17000bbl/year. Shortly after the relocation, Peter Amor's son Vernon Amor became managing director, with Peter Amor retaining the position of chairman, Vernon having trained as a brewer at Young's Brewery. By 2004 the company employed 15 people full-time, and  the head brewer was Jimmy Swan.

Water for brewing is drawn from an artesian well located on the brewery premises; local water chemistry is sensitive to time of day, so water is drawn only in the morning. Hops are mostly purchased from local farms.

Wye Valley Brewery owns The Barrels and The Britannia in Hereford, The Morgan in Malvern and The Rose and Lion in Bromyard; Peter Amor is the publican of The Barrels.
A further 400 outlets in Wales and England are supplied regularly, and beer is also sold in bottles.

Beers
Wye Valley's beer line is based around three flagship beers: HPA (Hereford Pale Ale), a hoppy, malty pale brewed to 4.0% abv; Wye Valley Bitter, a session bitter at 3.7% abv; and Butty Bach, a golden ale at 4.5% abv, which the Good Beer Guide describes as "A burnished gold, full-bodied premium ale".

In addition to the core beer line, a rotation of monthly ales is also produced.
A number of one-off beers have also been made for special events.

Wye Valley Brewery produces cask and bottle conditioned beer, and is a member of the Society of Independent Brewers.

Dorothy Goodbody

Wye Valley Brewery also produces beers, originally all seasonals, under the brand name Dorothy Goodbody. Dorothy Goodbody is an invented persona, supposedly a hop grower's daughter who developed an interest in brewing in the early 1950s in the village of Dormington, Herefordshire. The original premise of the brand was that each beer had been developed using only locally-grown Fuggle and Golding hops.
However, some Irish-grown hops are used as well, particularly Northdown in the Wholesome Stout. After a complaint concerning the brand's sex appeal was made by Alcohol Concern, the Portman Group's Independent Complaints Panel ruled that the brand's advertising did not breach its code of practice regarding alcohol advertising.

Goodbody is depicted in promotional materials as a blonde female with a face and physique similar to Marilyn Monroe, and usually wearing a low-cut blouse or dress with a high hemline. The sex appeal of this depiction was combined with extensive use of double entendre in the original campaign.

The most notable of the beers in this line is Dorothy Goodbody's Wholesome Stout, a dark traditional stout at 4.6% abv, which won the Champion Winter Beer Of Britain in 2002 and which is now produced year-round.

Awards
In addition to the Winter Ales overall championship in 2002, Wholesome Stout won the Stouts and Porters category at that festival in 2000 and 2002. Dorothy Goodbody's Golden Ale received the bronze medal in the Brewing Industry International Awards in its category in 2005; Butty Bach was Beer of the Festival at the Great Welsh Beer and Cider Festival in Cardiff in 1998, 1999 and 2000; and HPA was awarded the bronze medal for best bitters at the SIBA National Beer Competition in 2005. The brewery and its beers have also received numerous regional and local awards.

References

External links
 

Companies based in Herefordshire
Breweries in England
British companies established in 1985
Food and drink companies established in 1985
1985 establishments in England